George VII (alternatively known as George VI) (died February 22, 1720), of the Bagrationi Dynasty, was King of Imereti (western Georgia) in the periods of 1707–11, 1712–13, 1713–16, and 1719–1720.

Reign
An illegitimate son of Alexander IV of Imereti, George was declared, with the approval of the Ottoman government, a rightful king of Imereti by the loyal party of nobles in 1702, though it was not until 1707 that he was able to wrest the crown from the usurper Giorgi-Malakia Abashidze (George VI). In October 1711, a noble revolt deposed him in favor of Mamia III Gurieli who forced George to retire to Kartli, eastern Georgia. Later, with the support of the Turkish pasha of Akhaltsikhe, he defeated Mamia at the Battle of Chkhara in June 1712. Deposed again in November 1713, George resumed the throne upon Mamia’s death in January 1714, only to be forced, in 1716, by the rebellious nobles led by Prince Bejan Dadiani into exile to Constantinople. George succeeded in garnering the Ottoman support, and regained the crown in 1719. 

Yet, his reign proved to be short-lived; in February 1720, he was assassinated by the plotters led by Prince Simon Abashidze.

Family
George VII was married four times. His first wife was Rodam, daughter of George XI of Kartli whom he married in 1703 and divorced in 1712. George then married his second wife, Tamar, a daughter of Giorgi-Malakia Abashidze, ex-wife of Prince Giorgi Nizharadze, and repudiated the union in 1713 (she would marry her third husband Prince Merab Tsulukidze in 1714). He was then briefly married to Tamar, daughter of Papuna II, Duke of Racha, until her death in 1714. In 1716, George married his fourth and last wife Tamar (Kochibrola; died 1742), daughter of Mamia III Gurieli.

George VII was the father of four sons and four daughters:
 Alexander V of Imereti (1703–1752), born of George's first marriage with Rodam of Kartli; King of Imereti (1720–1741, 1741–1746, 1749–1749).
 Mamuka of Imereti (died 1769), born by Rodam, King of Imereti (1746–1749).
 Princess Tamar (fl. 1735), born by Rodam, married to Prince David Abashide. 
 Princess Tuta (fl. 1738), born by Rodam, married to Prince Papuna Chichua. 
 Anonymous daughter (fl. 1735), born by Rodam, married to Mamuka, Prince of Mukhrani.
 George IX of Imereti (1718–1778), born of George's fourth marriage with Tamar Gurieli; King of Imereti (1741).
 Princess Ana (fl. 1726), born by Tamar Gurieli, married to Zaal, Eristavi of Guria.
 Prince Rostom (fl. 1746), born by Tamar Gurieli.

References

 Вахушти Багратиони (Vakhushti Bagrationi) (1745). История Царства Грузинского: Жизнь Имерети.
David Marshall Lang, The Last Years of the Georgian Monarchy, 1658-1832. New York: Columbia University Press, 1957.
Donald Rayfield, Edge of Empires, A History of Georgia. London: Reakton Books Ltd, 2013.

1720 deaths
Bagrationi dynasty of the Kingdom of Imereti
Kings of Imereti
18th-century people from Georgia (country)
Year of birth unknown
Eastern Orthodox monarchs
Illegitimate children of Georgian monarchs
18th-century murdered monarchs
1720 murders in Asia
1720 murders in Europe